Cloud 7 is the first studio album by Tony Bennett, released in 1955.

The album featured material from the Great American Songbook and presented Bennett in a way different from his hit parade material of the early nineteen-fifties using a combo of jazz musicians. The album was arranged by the featured guitarist, Chuck Wayne, and trumpeter Charles Panely and was recorded between August and December 1954.

Track listing
Side one
"I Fall in Love Too Easily" (Sammy Cahn, Jule Styne) - 2:50
"My Baby Just Cares for Me" (Walter Donaldson, Gus Kahn) - 2:21
"My Heart Tells Me (Should I Believe My Heart?)" (Mack Gordon, Harry Warren) - 4:54
"Old Devil Moon" (Yip Harburg, Burton Lane) - 2:55
"Love Letters" (Edward Heyman, Victor Young) - 2:33

Side two
"My Reverie" (Larry Clinton, Claude Debussy) - 2:17
"Give Me the Simple Life" (Rube Bloom, Harry Ruby) - 4:13
"While the Music Plays On" (Irving Mills, Lupin Fein, Emery Heim) - 4:35
"I Can't Believe That You're in Love with Me" (Clarence Gaskill, Jimmy McHugh) - 3:09
"Darn That Dream" (Eddie DeLange, Jimmy Van Heusen) - 3:18

Personnel
 Tony Bennett – vocals, liner notes
 Dave Schildkraut – alto saxophone
 Charles Panely – trumpet, arranger
 Chuck Wayne – guitar, arranger
 Clyde Lombardi – double bass

Tracks 1 and 4
 Al Cohn – tenor saxophone
 Gene DiNovi – piano
 Sonny Igoe – drums

Other tracks
 Caesar DiMauro – tenor saxophone
 Harvey Leonard – piano
 Ed Shaughnessy – drums

CD additional personnel
 Danny Bennett – executive producer
 Steven Berkowitz – executive producer, A & R
 Stacey Boyle – tape research
 Lisa Buckler – project director
 Didier C. Deutsch – reissue producer
 Patti Matheny – artist coordination
 Darcy Proper – reissue producer, mastering
 Darren Salmieri – artist coordination
 Jonathan Schwartz – liner notes

References

1955 albums
Tony Bennett albums
Columbia Records albums
Albums produced by Mitch Miller
Albums arranged by Chuck Wayne